Hansell Araúz Ovares (born 9 August 1989) is a Costa Rican football midfielder.

Club career
Born in Golfito, Puntarenas, Araúz was raised in Guápiles, Limón by his mother. He began playing football in the local league and signed with C.S. Cartaginés in 2012.

Cartaginés
In January 2012, he signed a new contract with C.S. Cartaginés. On 15 January 2012, Araúz made his official debut for Cartaginés in the opening match in the Summer 2012 playing 74 minutes in the victory 1-3 over San Carlos. On 22 January 2012, Araúz played in the debut official match of Cartaginés for the Estadio Nacional de Costa Rica and substituted by José Sánchez at 56 minutes in the team's victory against tri-champion Alajuelense in the "Clasico Provincial". On 12 February 2012, he scored his debut official goal for the "Clasico Provincial" against Herediano at 45 minutes in week 7. At halftime, he picked up the ball with his chest on the edge of the box, shoot with the right leg and deviated to José Miguel Cubero for the 1-0. On 26 February 2012, scored his second goal for the club in week 10, was 0-1 against Santos de Guápiles, but the team would lose 3-2. On 18 April 2012, against Santos de Guápiles Araúz made the pass in the third goal for Pablo Brenes and in the fifth goal Araúz retrieves the ball, the Cartaginés made 5 passes and the play ends in a goal. The match would end 5-1. On 5 August 2012, score the third goal against the runner up Santos de Guapiles in the 6-0 victory, after a play between Erick Ponce and Pablo Brenes, the Mexican would make the center and Araúz would score a header in 59 minutes.

Turkey
In June 2013, he was hired by the Kayseri Erciyesspor, team of TFF 1. League in Turkey for two years.

Saprissa
In January 2014, Arauz was announced their new player by Deportivo Saprissa.

Puerto Golfito & Municipal Grecia
On 22 August 2018, Puerto Golfito FC confirmed the signing of Arauz. He played for the club until the end of 2018, before signing with Municipal Grecia on 11 January 2019.

International career
He was included but did not appear in the Costa Rica national football team for the 2011 Copa América, but did not play at all in the tournament.

Career statistics

References

External links 

1989 births
Living people
People from Puntarenas Province
Costa Rican footballers
Association football midfielders
2011 Copa América players
Santos de Guápiles footballers
C.S. Cartaginés players
Kayseri Erciyesspor footballers
Deportivo Saprissa players
A.D. Carmelita footballers
Municipal Grecia players
Süper Lig players
Liga FPD players
Costa Rican expatriate footballers
Expatriate footballers in Turkey
Costa Rican expatriate sportspeople in Turkey